Alexandros Emeka "Alex" Antetokounmpo (born Adetokunbo 27 August 2001) is a Greek-Nigerian professional basketball player for the Milwaukee Bucks of the National Basketball Association (NBA). He is the youngest brother of National Basketball Association (NBA) players Giannis, Thanasis, and Kostas.

Early life
Antetokounmpo was born in Sepolia, a neighbourhood in Athens, Greece. He is the son of Nigerian parents, Veronica and Charles Antetokounmpo. He has a Nigerian passport, which was granted to him in June 2013, so that he could gain a visa, and be allowed to legally enter into the United States. He received the Greek citizenship in September 2021, alongside his mother. He started playing basketball at age nine, and in sixth grade, moved with his family to Milwaukee, where his older brother Giannis was playing his rookie season for the Milwaukee Bucks of the National Basketball Association. He attended St. Monica School in Whitefish Bay, Wisconsin and initially did not speak English.

High school career
Antetokounmpo played basketball for Dominican High School in Whitefish Bay for four years. Antetokounmpo was a two-time all-state selection and averaged 20 points and seven rebounds per game as a senior. He received scholarship offers from DePaul, Ohio and Green Bay. On 9 May 2020, Antetokounmpo announced that he would play in Europe after graduating from high school, rather than playing college basketball. He was considered a three-star recruit by major recruiting services.

Professional career

UCAM Murcia (2020–2021)
On 22 June 2020, Antetokounmpo signed a three-year contract with UCAM Murcia of the Liga ACB. On 18 October, he made his debut for the club's reserve team in the Liga EBA, recording 28 points and six rebounds, shooting 6-of-9 from three-point range, in an 83–69 win over SCD Carolinas.

Raptors 905 (2021–2022)
After going undrafted in the 2021 NBA draft, Antetokounmpo joined the Sacramento Kings for the 2021 NBA Summer League. The Sacramento Kings then proceeded to win the 2021 NBA Summer League. On 14 October 2021, Antetokounmpo was signed to an Exhibit 10 contract by the Toronto Raptors. However, he was waived the following day to join the Raptors 905 as an affiliate player.

Wisconsin Herd (2022–present)
On November 3, 2022, Antetokounmpo was named to the opening night roster for the Wisconsin Herd in the NBA G League.

Personal life

Three of his older brothers, Giannis, Thanasis and Kostas, play basketball professionally, and all three have won NBA championships. Giannis was named NBA Most Valuable Player in both 2019 and 2020. Thanasis and Giannis both won the NBA championship in 2021 playing for the Milwaukee Bucks, with Giannis being named as Finals MVP. Kostas last played for the Chicago Bulls & won an NBA title with the Los Angeles Lakers in 2020. Antetokounmpo's father and his oldest brother, Francis, played football in Nigeria. His mother was a high jumper. In September 2021, Alex along with his mother were granted honorary Greek citizenship from the Prime Minister of Greece, Kyriakos Mitsotakis.
Alex, along with hockey player Filip Forsberg and three of his older brothers, Giannis, Thanasis and Kostas, were announced as joining the Nashville SC ownership group in the MLS.

References

2001 births
Living people
Antetokounmpo family
CB Murcia players
Citizens of Nigeria through descent
Greek expatriate basketball people in Canada
Greek expatriate basketball people in Spain
Greek expatriate basketball people in the United States
Greek men's basketball players
Greek people of Igbo descent
Greek people of Nigerian descent
Greek people of Yoruba descent
Greek emigrants to the United States
Naturalized citizens of Greece
Igbo sportspeople
Liga ACB players
Naturalized citizens of the United States
Raptors 905 players
Wisconsin Herd players
Small forwards
Basketball players from Athens
Yoruba sportspeople